Tang Wai-lok (Chinese: 鄧韋樂) is a Hong Kong Paralympic swimmer, he classifies as a class S14 Paraswimmer.

Personal life 
At the age of 6, Tang was diagnosed with mild intellectual disability and had to transfer to a special-needs school, at the age of 11 he began swimming and his efforts paid off in a call up to the youth team, and eventually the Hong Kong Paralympic Swimming Team for the 2012 Paralympics. One of Tang's biggest influences is his mother, who he says had a "vital role" in his success.

Awards and Accolades 
Accolades he has include being recipient of the 2014 Hong Kong Outstanding Youth Athlete, a 2015 International Sports Federation for Persons with Intellectual Disability Award for Best Male Athlete, as well as a 2016 Hong Kong Sports Star Award.

Performance Across Competitions

2012 Paralympic Games 
Tang participated in the 2012 Paralympic Games, finishing 7th in the Men's 100m Backstroke, 6th in the Men's 200m Freestyle and failing to make it out of his heat in the Men's 100m Breaststroke.

2016 Paralympic Games 
Tang won Hong Kong's first Paralympic Swimming Gold in the 2016 Paralympic Games, coming 1st in the men's 200 meter freestyle whilst setting a new Paralympic record at that time of 1:56.32, Tang also finished 4th in the Men's 100m backstroke.

2020 Paralympic Games 
In the 2020 Paralympic Games, Tang failed to defend his Olympic title for the Men's 200 meter freestyle, coming in 10th in his heat and failing to qualify to the knockout stages. Tang also finished 6th in the Men's 100 meter butterfly.

Other International Events 
In the 2015 INAS Global Games, Tang won Gold in the Men's 200m freestyle, Men's 200m and 400m Medley Relay and Men's 800m freestyle relay. Silver in the Men's 100m Freestyle, 100m Backstroke, 400m Men's freestyle Relay and Bronze in the Men's 50m backstroke.

Tang achieved Gold in the 2018 Asian Para Games for the Men's 200 meter freestyle, as well as Silver for the Men's 200 meter individual medley.

In the 2019 INAS Global Games, Tang achieved Gold in the Men's 4x50m medley relay, Silver in the Men's 4x50m,  Freestyle relay, Silver in the Men's  Medley Relay and Bronze in the Men's 100m freestyle and Men's 200m individual Medley.

References

Paralympic swimmers of Hong Kong
Swimmers at the 2012 Summer Paralympics
Swimmers at the 2016 Summer Paralympics
Swimmers at the 2020 Summer Paralympics
Paralympic gold medalists for Hong Kong
Living people
Medalists at the 2016 Summer Paralympics
1997 births
Hong Kong male freestyle swimmers
S14-classified Paralympic swimmers
Medalists at the 2018 Asian Para Games